Walter Bodneck (born 17 December 1885, date of death unknown) was a Russian Empire sports shooter. He competed in the men's trap event at the 1912 Summer Olympics.

References

1885 births
Year of death missing
Male sport shooters from the Russian Empire
Olympic shooters for the Russian Empire
Shooters at the 1912 Summer Olympics
Sportspeople from Pskov